Dyzaiss-Lys Mouithys Mickalad (born 4 July 1985) is a Congolese footballer who plays for Angoulême CFC.

External links
 
 
 Foot National
 

1985 births
Living people
Sportspeople from Brazzaville
Association football forwards
Republic of the Congo footballers
Republic of the Congo international footballers
Championnat National players
First Professional Football League (Bulgaria) players
TFF First League players
Stade Briochin players
FC Girondins de Bordeaux players
SO Châtellerault players
AS Cherbourg Football players
FC Libourne players
PFC Chernomorets Burgas players
Ankaraspor footballers
Expatriate footballers in Morocco
Expatriate footballers in Bulgaria
Expatriate footballers in Turkey